Robert Crawford may refer to:

Politicians 

 Robert Crawford (died 1706), MP and Governor of Sheerness
 Robert Wigram Crawford (1813–1889), British East India merchant, Governor of the Bank of England and Liberal Party MP, 1857–1874
 Robert Crawford (Canadian politician) (1834–1897), member of the 1st Council of the Northwest Territories for Qu'Appelle from 1886–1888
 Robert Fitzgerald Crawford (died 1895), British general, father of Robert Copland-Crawford
 Robert Crawford (Antrim politician) (1847–1946), Ulster Unionist Party Member of the Northern Ireland Parliament (MP) for Antrim then Mid Antrim
 Bob Crawford (Florida politician) (born 1948), Florida Commissioner of Agriculture
 Robert Stewart Crawford (1913–2002), British diplomat

Sportspeople 

 Robert Copland-Crawford (1852–1894), played for Scotland in the first international football match (son of Gen. Robert Crawford)
 Robert Crawford (Cambridge University cricketer) (1869–1917), English cricketer
 Robert Crawford (footballer) (1886–c. 1950), Liverpool footballer
 Bob Crawford (athlete) (1899–1970), American long-distance runner
 Bobby Crawford (footballer) (1901–1965), Scottish footballer
 Bob Crawford (ice hockey, born 1959), Canadian ice hockey player
 Bobby Crawford (ice hockey) (born 1960), American ice hockey player
 Robbie Crawford (footballer, born 1993), Scottish footballer for Charleston Battery
 Robbie Crawford (footballer, born 1994), Scottish footballer for Livingston

Writers 

Robert Crawford (Australian poet) (1868–1930), Australian poet
 Robert Crawford, pen-name of Hugh C. Rae (1935–2014), Scottish novelist and thriller writer
Robert Crawford (Scottish poet) (born 1959), Scottish poet, scholar and critic

Other people 

Robert Crawford Johnson (1882–1937), English inventor of the cube teapot
Robert H. Crawford (died 1942), American founder of Acme Markets
Robert Walter Crawford (1891–1981), American Army general
Robert MacArthur Crawford (1899–1961), composer who wrote the U.S. Air Force song
Robert Wilson Crawford (1906–1995), American parks and recreation professional
Robert Crawford (composer) (1925–2012), Scottish classical composer, who worked with Ilona Kabos
Robert Hugh Crawford (died 1930), horse judge and businessman in South Australia
Robert Crawford (psychiatrist) (1941–2021), New Zealand psychiatrist
Robert L. Crawford Jr. (born 1944), American television actor and film producer
Robert Crawford (historian) (born 1945), director of the Imperial War Museum